Aethra (minor planet designation: 132 Aethra) is a metallic asteroid and Mars-crosser on an eccentric orbit from the asteroid belt. It measures approximately 40 kilometers in diameter.

It was discovered by James Craig Watson in 1873 and is the first such Mars-crosser asteroid to be identified. As a Mars-crosser asteroid, Aethra is the lowest numbered asteroid to not have proper orbital elements due to recurring perturbations by Mars. It has a rather eccentric orbit that sometimes brings it closer to the Sun than the planet Mars.

With an original observation arc of only 22 days, 132 Aethra was a lost asteroid between 1873 and 1922.

The varying light curve of the asteroid implies an elongated or irregular shape for its body.

It is named after Aethra, the mother of Theseus in Greek mythology.

References

External links 
 
 

Mars-crossing asteroids
Aethra
Aethra
M-type asteroids (Tholen)
Xe-type asteroids (SMASS)
18730613